The enzyme phospholipase A2 (EC 3.1.1.4, PLA2, systematic name  phosphatidylcholine 2-acylhydrolase) catalyse the cleavage of fatty acids in position 2 of phospholipids, hydrolyzing the bond between the second fatty acid “tail” and the glycerol molecule:

phosphatidylcholine + H2O = 1-acylglycerophosphocholine + a carboxylate

This particular phospholipase specifically recognizes the sn2 acyl bond of phospholipids and catalytically hydrolyzes the bond, releasing arachidonic acid and lysophosphatidic acid.  Upon downstream modification by cyclooxygenases or lipoxygenases, arachidonic acid is modified into active compounds called eicosanoids.   Eicosanoids include prostaglandins and leukotrienes, which are categorized as anti-inflammatory and inflammatory mediators.

PLA2 enzymes are commonly found in mammalian tissues as well as arachnid, insect, and snake venom. Venom from bees is largely composed of melittin, which is a stimulant of PLA2.  Due to the increased presence and activity of PLA2 resulting from a snake or insect bite, arachidonic acid is released from the phospholipid membrane disproportionately.    As a result, inflammation and pain occur at the site.  There are also prokaryotic A2 phospholipases.

Additional types of phospholipases include phospholipase A1, phospholipase B, phospholipase C, and phospholipase D.

Families
Phospholipases A2 include several unrelated protein families with common enzymatic activity. Two most notable families are secreted and cytosolic phospholipases A2. Other families include Ca2+ independent PLA2 (iPLA2) and lipoprotein-associated PLA2s (lp-PLA2), also known as platelet activating factor acetylhydrolase (PAF-AH).

Secreted phospholipases A2 (sPLA2)
The extracellular forms of phospholipases A2 have been isolated from different venoms (snake, bee, and wasp), from virtually every studied mammalian tissue (including pancreas and kidney) as well as from bacteria.  They require Ca2+ for activity.

Pancreatic sPLA2 serve for the initial digestion of phospholipid compounds in dietary fat. Venom phospholipases help to immobilize prey by promoting cell lysis.

In mice, group III sPLA2 are involved in sperm maturation, and group X are thought to be involved in sperm capacitation.

sPLA2 has been shown to promote inflammation in mammals by catalyzing the first step of the arachidonic acid pathway by breaking down phospholipids, resulting in the formation of fatty acids including arachidonic acid. This arachidonic acid is then metabolized to form several inflammatory and thrombogenic molecules. Excess levels of sPLA2 is thought to contribute to several inflammatory diseases, and has been shown to promote vascular inflammation correlating with coronary events in coronary artery disease and acute coronary syndrome, and possibly leading to acute respiratory distress syndrome  and progression of tonsillitis.

In children, excess levels of sPLA2 have been associated with inflammation thought to exacerbate asthma and ocular surface inflammation (dry eye).

Increased sPLA2 activity is observed in the cerebrospinal fluid of humans with Alzheimer's disease and multiple sclerosis, and may serve as a marker of increases in permeability of the blood-cerebrospinal fluid barrier.

There are atypical members of the phospholipase A2 family, such as PLA2G12B, that have no phospholipase activity with typical phospholipase substrate. The lack of enzymatic activity of PLA2G12B indicates that it may have unique function distinctive from other sPLA2s. It has been shown that in PLA2G12B null mice VLDL levels were greatly reduced, suggesting it could have an effect in lipoprotein secretion

Cytosolic phospholipases A2 (cPLA2)
The intracellular, group IV PLA2 are also Ca-dependent, but they have a different 3D structure and are significantly larger than secreted PLA2 (more than 700 residues). They include a C2 domain and a large catalytic domain.

These phospholipases are involved in cell signaling processes, such as inflammatory response. They release arachidonic acid from membrane phospholipids.  Arachidonic acid is both a signaling molecule and the precursor for the synthesis of other signaling molecules termed eicosanoids. These include leukotrienes and prostaglandins. Some eicosanoids are synthesized from diacylglycerol, released from the lipid bilayer by phospholipase C (see below).

Phospholipases A2 can be classified based on sequence homology.

Lipoprotein-associated PLA2s (lp-PLA2)

Increased levels of lp-PLA2 are associated with cardiac disease, and may contribute to atherosclerosis. Although, the role of LP-PLA2 in atherosclerosis may depend on its carrier in plasma, and several lines of evidence suggest that HDL-associated Lp-PLA2 may substantially contribute to the HDL antiatherogenic activities.

Mechanism
The suggested catalytic mechanism of pancreatic sPLA2 is initiated by a His-48/Asp-99/calcium complex within the active site. The calcium ion polarizes the sn-2 carbonyl oxygen while also coordinating with a catalytic water molecule, w5. His-48 improves the nucleophilicity of the catalytic water via a bridging second water molecule, w6.  It has been suggested that two water molecules are necessary to traverse the distance between the catalytic histidine and the ester. The basicity of His-48 is thought to be enhanced through hydrogen bonding with Asp-99.  An asparagine substitution for His-48 maintains wild-type activity, as the amide functional group on asparagine can also function to lower the pKa, or acid dissociation constant, of the bridging water molecule.  The rate limiting state is characterized as the degradation of the tetrahedral intermediate composed of a calcium coordinated oxyanion.  The role of calcium can also be duplicated by other relatively small cations like cobalt and nickel. Before becoming active in digestion, the proform of PLA2 is activated by Trypsin.

PLA2 can also be characterized as having a channel featuring a hydrophobic wall in which hydrophobic amino acid residues such as Phe, Leu, and Tyr serve to bind the substrate.  Another component of PLA2 is the seven disulfide bridges that are influential in regulation and stable protein folding.

Biological Effects
PLA2 action can release histamine from rat peritoneal mast cells.  It also causes histamine release in human basophils.

Regulation
Due to the importance of PLA2 in inflammatory responses, regulation of the enzyme is essential.  cPLA2 is regulated by phosphorylation and calcium concentrations.  cPLA2 is phosphorylated by a MAPK at Serine-505.  When phosphorylation is coupled with an influx of calcium ions, cPLA2 becomes stimulated and can translocate to the membrane to begin catalysis.

Phosphorylation of cPLA2 may be a result of ligand binding to receptors, including:
5-HT2 receptors 
mGLUR1
bFGF receptor
IFN-α receptor
IFN-γ receptor

In the case of an inflammation, the application of glucocorticoids up-regulate (mediated at the gene level) the production of the protein lipocortin which may inhibit cPLA2 and reduce the inflammatory response.

Relevance in neurological disorders
In normal brain cells, PLA2 regulation accounts for a balance between arachidonic acid's conversion into proinflammatory mediators and its reincorporation into the membrane. In the absence of strict regulation of PLA2 activity, a disproportionate amount of proinflammatory mediators are produced. The resulting induced oxidative stress and neuroinflammation is analogous to neurological diseases such as Alzheimer's disease, epilepsy, multiple sclerosis, ischemia. Lysophospholipids  are another class of molecules released from the membrane that are upstream predecessors of platelet activating factors (PAF).  Abnormal levels of potent PAF are also associated with neurological damage.  An optimal enzyme inhibitor would specifically target PLA2 activity on neural cell membranes already under oxidative stress and potent inflammation. Thus, specific inhibitors of brain PLA2 could be a pharmaceutical approach to treatment of several disorders associated with neural trauma.

Increase in phospholipase A2 activity is an acute-phase reaction that rises during inflammation, which is also seen to be exponentially higher in low back disc herniations compared to rheumatoid arthritis.  It is a mixture of inflammation and substance P that are responsible for pain.

Increased phospholipase A2 has also been associated with neuropsychiatric disorders such as schizophrenia and pervasive developmental disorders (such as autism), though the mechanisms involved are not known.

Isozymes 
Human phospholipase A2 isozymes include:
 Group I: PLA2G1B
 Group II: PLA2G2A, PLA2G2D, 
 Group III: 
 Group IV: PLA2G4A, PLA2G4B, PLA2G4C, 
 Group V: PLA2G5
 Group VI: PLA2G6
 Group VII: PLA2G7
 Group X: PLA2G10
 Group XII: PLA2G12A, 

In addition, the following human proteins contain the phospholipase A2 domain:

See also
 Paul Sigler

References

External links 
 

Peripheral membrane proteins